Mattia Coletti (born September 25, 1984) is an Italian ski mountaineer.

Coletti was born in Sondalo. He started ski mountaineering in 1998 and competed first in the Trofeo Folgore race in the same year. He has been member of the Italian national team since 2000.

Selected results 
 2003:
 3rd, European Championship single race "juniors" class
 2006:
 1st, Italian Championship
 2nd, World Cup "espoirs" class
 2007:
 6th, Trofeo Mezzalama (together with Daniele Pedrini and Lorenzo Holzknecht)

External links 
Mattia Coletti at skimountaineering.org

1984 births
Living people
Italian male ski mountaineers
People from Sondalo
Sportspeople from the Province of Sondrio